Goniothalamus thwaitesii is a species of small tree in the Annonaceae family. It is endemic to the Western Ghats of India and Sri Lanka.

Flowers
Borne solitarily and axillarily.

Fruits
Sessile, one-seeded clustered berry.

Ecology
rain forest understory.

References

Flora of Sri Lanka
thwaitesii
Taxa named by Joseph Dalton Hooker
Taxa named by Thomas Thomson (botanist)